Ajay Navaria (born 1972, Delhi) is the author of two collections of short stories, Patkatha aur Anya Kahaniyan (2006) and Yes Sir (2012), and a novel, Udhar ke Log (2009). He has been associated with the premier Hindi literary journal, Hans. Navaria is a professor in the Hindi department at Jamia Milia Islamia University, Delhi. Unclaimed Terrain (2013), an anthology of his short stories translated into English, has been critically acclaimed.

References 

21st-century Indian writers
Living people
1972 births
Academic staff of Jamia Millia Islamia